Al-Judeida is a Palestinian village in the Jenin Governorate in the western area of the West Bank, located  south of Jenin. According to the Palestinian Central Bureau of Statistics, the town had a population of 4,738 in the 2007 census.

History
Al-Judeida is an ancient village,  where  Byzantine  ceramics have been found.  Zertal notes that the sherds from the Byzantine era were at the edge of the hilltop upon which al-Judeida stands.

Pottery sherds found in the village mostly date back to the medieval and Ottoman eras.  During Crusader rule, in 1168, al-Judeida was an estate called Gidideh.

Ottoman era
Like all of Palestine, al-Judeida was incorporated into the Ottoman Empire in 1517. In the 1596 Ottoman tax registers, al-Judeida was an entirely Muslim village with a population of 10 families,  located in the Nahiya Jabal Sami, in the Nablus Sanjak. The inhabitants paid a fixed tax-rate of 33.3% on agricultural products, including wheat, barley, summer crops, olive trees, goats and beehives, in addition to occasional revenues and a press for grape syrup or olive oil; a total of 3,500  akçe.

Most of the buildings in the old core of Judeida date back to the 16th and 17th centuries. 

In 1838,  Edward Robinson noted the village when he travelled in the region, as bordering the extremely fertile Marj Sanur. He listed  it as part of the District of Haritheh, north of Nablus.

In 1870, French traveler Victor Guérin visited al-Judeida, describing it as being amid "gardens of fig trees, pomegranates and olives. It seems to be an ancient site, because of the many rock hewn cisterns and the well-shaped stones contained in the walls of its 35 houses."  In 1882, it was described by the PEF's Survey of Western Palestine as "a good-sized village on flat ground, with a few olives".

British Mandate era
In the  1922 British census, Al-Judeida had a population of 361, all  Muslims,  increasing in the 1931 census to 569  inhabitants, still all Muslims, living in a total of 106 houses.

In the 1945 statistics,   the population was 830, all Muslims, with 6,360  dunams of land, according to an official land and population survey. Of the village's lands, 2,211 dunams were used for plantations and irrigable land, 2,850  dunams for cereals, while 20 dunams were built-up (urban) areas.

Jordanian era
Following the 1948 Arab–Israeli War, and the subsequent 1949 Armistice Agreements, Al-Judeida came under Jordanian rule.

The Jordanian census of 1961 found 1,351 inhabitants in Judeida.

Post-1967
Since the Six-Day War in 1967, Al-Judeida has been under Israeli occupation. Under the Oslo Accords, the town was assigned to Area A.

On Saturday 9 January 2016 resident Ali Abu Maryam (23) was shot dead by Israeli soldiers at the Beka'ot roadblock.

Geography
Al-Judeida is situated at the southern edge of the Marj Sanur valley on a small hilltop with an elevation of about 425 meters above sea level. The old core of al-Judeida is in the center of the village and is relatively small with an area of 14 dunams. It has narrow alleys that meet at a square in the old core's center. The nearest localities are Siris to the southwest, Meithalun to the northwest, Sir to the north, Aqqaba to the northeast and Tubas to the east.

Demographics
Al-Judeida had a population of 3,639 in the 1997 census by the Palestinian Central Bureau of Statistics (PCBS). Palestinian refugees and their descendants accounted for 17.5% of the inhabitants. In the 2007 PCBS census, al-Judeida's population grew to 4,738. The number of households was 923, with each household containing an average of between five members. Women made up 49.8% of the population and men 50.2%.

References

Bibliography

External links
Welcome To Judeida
 Judaydah, Welcome to Palestine
Survey of Western Palestine, Map 11: IAA, Wikimedia commons

Jenin Governorate
Villages in the West Bank
Municipalities of the State of Palestine